Donald's Lucky Day is a 1939 Donald Duck cartoon released by Walt Disney Productions.

Plot
In a harborside building on a foggy night (February 13), which happens to fall on Friday the 13th, two criminals prepare a gift bomb to send to someone named "Scarpuss" at "1313 13th Street" for Valentine's Day. Donald Duck is hired to deliver the package, being unaware of the bomb it contains. Complications arise when a black cat crosses his path, but fortunately for Donald, the cat ends up knocking the bomb into the water of the harbor, and he survives.

Voice cast
 Donald Duck: Clarence Nash
 Black Cat: Purv Pullen

Reception
Motion Picture Herald reviewed the short on October 11, 1938, saying: "The fowl is a messenger boy this time, commissioned to deliver an infernal machine on Friday the 13th. His errand is stymied by a playful but very black cat which is unintentionally but most amusingly instrumental in preventing Donald's death by dynamite. Donald is less quarrelsome and deal more understandable than commonly. It's one of his best appearances."

Home media
The short was released on May 18, 2004, on Walt Disney Treasures: The Chronological Donald, Volume One: 1934-1941.

References

External links

1930s color films
1939 animated films
1939 films
1939 short films
1939 comedy films
Films directed by Jack King
Films produced by Walt Disney
1930s Disney animated short films
Films scored by Oliver Wallace
Donald Duck short films
Films with screenplays by Carl Barks